Tanya Lesley Osborne (born 2 April 1971) is a former Australian rugby union player. She represented  and was a member of the squad to the 1998 Rugby World Cup.

Osborne was born and raised in Cunnamulla, Queensland. She was working for Australia Post when she was selected to play for the Wallaroos.

Osborne made her international debut for Australia in the 1996 Laurie O'Reilly Cup test match against the Black Ferns. She made her final appearance for the Wallaroos in 2001 against  at Sydney.

Osborne joined the Australian Army in 2018 and served with A Battery, 1st Regiment, Royal Australian Artillery which is based at Gallipoli Barracks in Brisbane.

References

External links
 
 Profile at Classic Wallabies.com.au

1971 births
Living people
Australia women's international rugby union players
Australian female rugby union players
20th-century Australian women
21st-century Australian women